Stay Gold may refer to:

Music

Albums
 Stay Gold (Butch Walker album) or the title song, 2016
 Stay Gold (CNBLUE album), 2017
 Stay Gold (First Aid Kit album) or the title song, 2014
 Stay Gold, by Ozark Henry, 2013
 Stay Gold, by Pony Up, 2009

Songs
 "Stay Gold" (BTS song), by BTS from Map of the Soul: 7 – The Journey (2020)
 "Stay Gold" (Hikaru Utada song), by Hikaru Utada from Heart Station (2008)
 "Stay Gold", by the Apples in Stereo from The Discovery of a World Inside the Moone (2000)
 "Stay Gold", by Aqua Timez
 "Stay Gold", by the Big Pink from Future This (2012)
 "Stay Gold", by Gacharic Spin from Generation Gap (2017)
 "Stay Gold", by Momoiro Clover Z
 "Stay Gold", by Run the Jewels from Run the Jewels 3 (2016)
 "Stay Gold", by Stevie Wonder from the 1983 film The Outsiders

Other uses
 Stay Gold (horse) (1994–2015), a Japanese Thoroughbred racehorse

See also
 "Stay gold, Ponyboy", a phrase from coming-of-age novel The Outsiders by S.E. Hinton